Izrail L. Shmurun  (July 19, 1912 in Tiraspol - June 28, 1985 in Chișinău) was a Moldavian Soviet architect.

He graduated from the Architecture Faculty of the Odessa Institute of Municipal and Civil Engineering in 1939. In 1941-1944 he worked in the design organization in Bashkiria, and from 1944 at the design institute Moldgiprostroe. In 1954 developed the master plan for Tiraspol (with V.P. Aleksandrov, and in the years 1960-1963 he developed a reconstruction project of Tiraspol City Theatre (State Drama Theater) and the Theater Square, in conjunction with D.I. Palatnikov.

In Chisinau, Shmurun was the author of the project of the Republican Children's Clinical Hospital (1952), College of Soviet Trade (1955), the main building of Chisinau State University (1963), and the Moldova Hotel. He was involved in administrative work in the State Planning Committee of the Council of Ministers of the Moldavian SSR in 1973–1985.

Literature 
 Berkovich, Gary. Reclaiming a History. Jewish Architects in Imperial Russia and the USSR. Volume 3. Socialist Realism: 1933–1955. Weimar und Rostock: Grunberg Verlag. 2022. P. 104. .

References

1912 births
1985 deaths
People from Tiraspol
People from Tiraspolsky Uyezd
Soviet architects
Moldovan architects